William Robert Button (December 3, 1895 – April 15, 1921) was a United States Marine Corps corporal who received the Medal of Honor for his actions in killing Haitian nationalist leader Charlemagne Peralte on October 31–November 1, 1919. (Second Lieutenant Herman H. Hanneken was also awarded the Medal of Honor on that date.) Button rose to the rank of sergeant before dying at age 25 from malaria.

Biography
Button was born December 3, 1895, in St. Louis, Missouri and after joining the Marine Corps was sent to fight in Haiti. He was in command of a group of Gendarmerie near Grande Riviere, Republic of Haiti, on October 31-November 1, 1919 when they engaged a group of Haitians opposed to the U.S. occupation. By the end of fighting Charlemagne Péralte, alleged in Button's citation to be "the supreme bandit chief in the Republic of Haiti", had been killed and about 1,200 of his followers had been killed, captured, or dispersed.

For risking his life in battle he, along with Sergeant Herman H. Hanneken, were cited for bravery, and recommended for the United States militaries highest decoration for bravery, the Medal of Honor, for their actions. The medal was approved by the Secretary of the Navy on June 10, 1920, and presented by the Major General Commandant of the Marine Corps, John A. Lejeune, at a ceremony in Washington, D.C., July 1, 1920. After the ceremony he took a short furlough to his hometown of St. Louis before returning to Haiti.

He died of pernicious malaria April 15, 1921 at the Department Hospital, Cap-Haïtien, Haiti, at the age of 25. At the request of his father his remains were returned to the United States and he is buried at Valhalla Cemetery, Saint Louis, Missouri. His grave can be found in section 5S, lot 66, grave 1. The Marines he served with in the Gendarmerie d'Haiti donated money to place a bronze memorial tablet on his grave, and stated that any additional funds would be used to place flowers on his grave each Memorial Day.

Honors and awards

Medal of Honor citation
The President of the United States takes pride in presenting the MEDAL OF HONOR to

For service as set forth in the following Citation:

For extraordinary heroism and conspicuous gallantry and intrepidity in actual conflict with the enemy near GRANDE RIVIERE Republic of Haiti, on the night of October 31 - November 1, 1919, resulting in the death of Charlemagne Peralte, the supreme bandit chief in the Republic of Haiti, and the killing and capture and dispersal of about twelve hundred (1,200) of his outlaw followers. Corporal William R. Button not only distinguished himself by his excellent judgment and leadership, but unhesitatingly exposed himself to great personal danger, when the slightest error would have forfeited not only his life but the lives of the detachments of Gendarmerie under his command. The successful termination of his mission will undoubtedly prove of untold value to the Republic of Haiti.

USNS Sgt. William R. Button
The United States Navy named a roll-on/roll-off container ship, the USNS Sgt. William R. Button (T-AK-3012) in his honor.

See also
List of Medal of Honor recipients

Notes

References

External links

1895 births
1921 deaths
United States Marines
United States Marine Corps Medal of Honor recipients
Military personnel from St. Louis
Occupation of Haiti recipients of the Medal of Honor
Deaths from malaria
Infectious disease deaths in Haiti